Muhammad Mirzahady Bin Amir, also known as Hady Mirza (born 28 January 1980) is a Singaporean singer.

He was the winner of the second season of the reality TV show Singapore Idol. He was crowned the winner on 25 September 2006 at the Singapore Indoor Stadium after garnering 70% of about one million votes cast by television viewers.

He was also the winner of the world's first Asian Idol competition held on 16 December 2007 in Jakarta, Indonesia. Asian Idol is a competition between six Idol winners from several different Asian countries, namely Singapore Idol, Malaysian Idol, Indonesian Idol, Indian Idol, Philippine Idol and Vietnam Idol.

After years of not appearing in the limelight, Hady made his comeback by joining Gegar Vaganza 6 in 2019. Hady was named co-winner of the sixth season of the Malaysian television singing show, sharing the title with Naqiu Boboy.

Hady is most known for his smooth R&B voice and charming personality.

Biography
Hady was born to a family of Buginese descent with roots from Sulawesi, Indonesia.

Hady studied engineering at Temasek Polytechnic.

Hady's debut album, self-titled Hady Mirza, was released in Singapore on 13 November 2006  and achieved Platinum status within 4 days of its release. The album is due to be re-released in 2008 with additional material.

Hady was awarded with two major awards in Anugerah Planet Muzik 2007, a yearly Malay music award show awarding the best musicians in Singapore, Malaysia, and Indonesia. Hady was voted "Most Popular Artiste (Singapore)" and his self-penned Malay single Merpati was voted "Most Popular Song (Singapore)". Hady was also voted "Most Popular Artiste (Singapore)" in Anugerah Planet Muzik 2008.

One year after his Singapore Idol win, Hady won the world's first-ever Asian Idol, featuring Idol winners from six countries: Singapore, Malaysia, Indonesia, Vietnam, Philippines and India. With his unique soulful voice and charming looks, Hady will now represent Asia to promote diversified Asian music to the world. Hady's two performance choices were: Berserah, composed by Taufik Batisah and Beautiful Day by U2. 

During the results show, he also performed Do I Make You Proud with American Idol Season 5 winner Taylor Hicks and the other Asian Idol contestants, as well as a highly-popular version of George Michael's Freedom! '90 with Malaysian Idol Jaclyn Victor. He also hosted Singapore Idol during the third season.

Hady won awards in three voting-based categories; Most Popular Singapore Artiste, Most Popular Singapore Song, and Most Popular Regional Song, for his hit 
Angkasa  at Anugerah Planet Muzik 2011, an annual award event organised by two Malay MediaCorp Radio Stations, WARNA 94.2FM & RIA 89.7FM. Hady also won awards in two voting-based categories, Most Popular Singapore Song and Most Popular Regional Song, for his hit Ku Tetap Kan Menunggu at Anugerah Planet Muzik 2012.

Singapore Idol

Gegar Vaganza (Season 6)

Discography

Albums

Note: In Singapore, albums get the Platinum status when 15,000 albums are sold, instead of 1 million in the US, due to its smaller population size.

Filmography

Television

Awards and achievements

References

External links
Singapore Idol Hady's Profile
Official Instagram- @hadymirzaofficial 
Hady Mirza Fan Club- Hady United FC

1980 births
Asian Idol
Idols (TV series) winners
Living people
Singaporean people of Bugis descent
21st-century Singaporean male singers
Temasek Polytechnic alumni